Nous is a philosophical term for the faculty of the human mind.

Nous may also refer to:

Noûs, quarterly peer-reviewed academic journal on philosophy
Nous (Daniel Bélanger album), 2009
Nous (Diane Birch EP), 2016